Vathiyur is a village in the Ariyalur taluk of Ariyalur district, Tamil Nadu, India.

Demographics 

 census, Vathiyur had a total population of 4894 with 2443 males and 2451 females.

References 

Villages in Ariyalur district